Kincaid is a village in Christian County, Illinois. The population was 1,349 at the 2020 census.

Geography
Kincaid is located at  (39.587582, -89.415409).

The village is located near Sangchris Lake.

Demographics

As of the 2020 census there were 1,349 people, 643 households, and 383 families residing in the village. The racial makeup of the village was 94.44% White, 0.59% African American, 0.22% Native American, 0.07% Asian, 0.22% from other races, and 4.45% from two or more races. Hispanic or Latino of any race were 0.74% of the population.

There were 643 households, out of which 30.48% had children under the age of 18 living with them, 48.06% were married couples living together, 6.84% had a female householder with no husband present, and 40.44% were non-families. 32.35% of all households were made up of individuals, and 13.53% had someone living alone who was 65 years of age or older. The average household size was 2.77 and the average family size was 2.22.

The village's age distribution consisted of 14.8% under the age of 18, 11.6% from 18 to 24, 19.7% from 25 to 44, 35.7% from 45 to 64, and 18.1% who were 65 years of age or older. The median age was 49.8 years. For every 100 females, there were 101.4 males. For every 100 females age 18 and over, there were 100.0 males.

The median income for a household in the village was $57,139, and the median income for a family was $82,250. Males had a median income of $53,194 versus $31,250 for females. The per capita income for the village was $34,174. About 5.5% of families and 13.5% of the population were below the poverty line, including 20.5% of those under age 18 and 19.7% of those age 65 or over.

Notable people 

 Larry Bucshon, congressman from Indiana (IN-8); grew up in Kincaid
 Harry Chiti, catcher for the Chicago Cubs, Kansas City Athletics, Detroit Tigers, and New York Mets; born in Kincaid 
 Chuck Boerio, linebacker for the Green Bay Packers; born in Kincaid

References

Villages in Christian County, Illinois
Villages in Illinois